"What Do Ya Think About That" is a song written by Anthony Smith and Brett Jones, and recorded by American country music duo Montgomery Gentry. It was released in July 2007 as the third single from their album Some People Change.

Content
The song is an up-tempo in which the narrator states that he stands by his beliefs, and will not let himself be persuaded by the comments made by his peers ("I don't give a durn what other people think / What do ya think about that?").

Critical reception
Chris Willman described the song negatively in his review, saying that its "defense of the American right to piss off your neighbors" conflicted with the message of the album's title track.

Official versions
 "What Do Ya Think About That" (Album Version) – 3:40

Chart performance

Year-end charts

References

2007 singles
Montgomery Gentry songs
Songs written by Anthony Smith (singer)
Columbia Records singles
Song recordings produced by Mark Wright (record producer)
2006 songs
Songs written by Brett Jones (songwriter)